Specialty coffee is a term for the highest grade of coffee available, typically relating to the entire supply chain, using single origin or single estate coffee. The term was first used in 1974 by Erna Knutsen in an issue of Tea & Coffee Trade Journal. Knutsen used specialty coffee to describe beans of the best flavor which are produced in special micro-climates.

Specialty coffee is related to the farmers and the brewer what is known as the third wave of coffee, especially throughout North America. This refers to a modern demand for exceptional quality coffee, both farmed and brewed to a significantly higher than average standard.

Definition 
The widely accepted definition of specialty coffee is coffee scoring 80 points or above on the 100-point scale used on the Specialty Coffee Association Cupping form. Coffee scoring from 90–100 is graded Outstanding, coffee that scores 85–89.99 is graded Excellent, while coffee scoring 80–84.99 is graded Very Good.

The Specialty Coffee Association has a series of more detailed specifications (SCA is the union of the Specialty Coffee Association of American (SCAA) and Europe (SCAE)). The SCA sets standards for specialty coffee at every stage of the coffee production, including allowable defects in green beans, water standards, and brew strength. The SCA also sets clear standards on the coffee grading process. A minimum requirement for a specialty coffee is the number of defects: to be considered specialty a coffee must have 0 to 5 defects every  of milled beans.

Although there are different definitions of specialty coffee according to different international organisation, there's a general acceptance of a set of three minimum requirements: coffee should have been hand picked by selective picking of mature beans, scoring 80 or above, maximum 5 defects per .

Many organisations and activists are working to include strict environmental and social indicators in the definition and grading of specialty coffee. For example biologist Giorgio Piracci, president of the Peruvian NGO 7Elements Peru and producer of the first specialty coffee produced applying permaculture ethics and principles, argues that "there's a urgent need to redefine the concept of quality and to embed into it the environmental and socio-economic quality component both at production and distribution level"; according to his vision,  "it makes no sense to talk about an "excellent" coffee if this is produced using harmful pesticides, fertilisers or environmentally impacting farming techniques; in the same way, "how can we talk about excellence if a cup of coffee is produced thanks to modern forms of slavery and human exploitation?"

Similar positions are often promoted by Fernando Morales-de La Cruz, journalist and founder of Coffee for Change, an organisation fighting against the use of child labour in the coffee industry; the journalist is very active also in showing up how the labelling system of "Fair trade" is often used although poor, unfair economic conditions for farmers. In a recent interview, at a European Parliament hearing on child labor in cocoa & coffee, Ange Aboa a Reuters correspondent for West & Central Africa said "certifications Fairtrade, UTZ & RainforestAlliance are the biggest scam of the century!". Morales-de La Cruz stated that "It's unacceptable and illegal that seventy years after signing the Universal Declaration of Human Rights Europe's 'Fairtrade' coffee, tea & cocoa is grown with slave & child labor. The European Union is the largest importer of coffee in the world. In 2019 Europe paid poor coffee growers 75% less than in 1983".

Growing locations 
In general, coffee is grown in the "Bean Belt", between the Tropics of Cancer and Capricorn, which produce the tropical climate required for trees to thrive. Speciality coffee is typically grown in three continents: South and Central Americas, Asia, and Africa.

Specialty coffee consumption 
In Australia and New Zealand, specialty coffee is considered mainstream with major specialty wholesalers like Campos coffee supplying hundreds of Australian cafes. This is perhaps partly due to a long history of espresso consumption, fuelled by large Italian and Greek migrations in the mid-twentieth century.

While specialty coffee in North America is rarely offered in major coffee chains, the Third Wave of Coffee has resulted in a significant increase in specialty coffee consumption. Independent, "Australian-style", or artisan cafes have opened in multiple cities. An SCAA report estimated the US had 29,300 specialty coffee shops in 2013, up from 2,850 in 1993.

Europe is already a major coffee market accounting for 30% of global consumption, but is seeing a growth in demand for specialty coffee while overall demand remains stable. In 2016, specialty coffee was Europe's fastest growing major restaurant category, with an increase of 9.1% from 2014–2015. Western Europe saw a particularly large growth of 10.5% in the specialty cafe market, while the overall coffee industry reduced by 1.5%, perhaps due to a longer history of coffee consumption. In 2021, Europe region emerged as the largest market for the global specialty coffee market with a 46.21% share of the market revenue

Asia is projected to soon represent the world's largest consumer of specialty coffee, with over US$3.7 billion in new value growth projected from 2016–2020. Despite Asia being traditionally dominated by tea consumption, it is now easy to find specialty coffee shops across many Korean, Chinese and Japanese cities.

There have also been increases in the consumption of coffee from countries traditionally responsible for growing coffee. Brazil's overall coffee consumption in 2014 was 21 million bags, close to that of the US at 23.4 million bags. Guatemala is also experiencing a surge in popularity of specialty coffee.

In Qatar and the rest of the Gulf region, the consumption of Specialty Coffee has increased progressively into a flourishing industry since mid-2010's. Noting  Specialty Coffee is very distinct to the traditional Kahwah Al Arabiya which already had a considerable presence in the gulfian market.

Associations in consuming countries 
 Specialty Coffee Association of America
 Speciality Coffee Association of Europe
 Specialty Coffee Association of Japan
 New Zealand Specialty Coffee Association
 Singapore Coffee Association
 AustralAsian Specialty Coffee Association
 Specialty Coffee Association of Korea
 Specialty Coffee Association of Southern Africa
 SCA Italy

Associations in producing and consuming countries 
 ANACAFE's Guatemalan Cup of Excellence  
 Specialty Coffee Association of Bolivia 
 Brazil Specialty Coffee Association
 Colombian Coffee Federation
 Specialty Coffee Association of Costa Rica
 African Fine Coffees Association
 Itzalco Fine Coffee Association of El Salvador
 Specialty Coffee Association of India
 Specialty Coffee Association of Indonesia
 Asociación de Cafés Especiales de Nicaragua
 Association of Special Coffees of Panama
 Specialty Coffee Association of Southern Africa
 Asociación Mexicana de Cafés y Cafeterías de Especialidad A.C.

See also 

 Specialty foods

External links 
 What Is Specialty Coffee?

References 

 
Coffee